Affectionately Melanie (aka Melanie) is the second album by Melanie Safka. It contains "Beautiful People", a song that Melanie performed at the Woodstock Festival in 1969.
In the Netherlands, this album was released as Back in Town.

Track listing 
All songs written by Melanie Safka; except where indicated
 "I'm Back in Town"
 "Tuning My Guitar"
 "Soul Sister Annie" (Thomas Jefferson Kaye; adapted by Melanie)
 "Any Guy"
 "Uptown Down"
 "Again"
 "Beautiful People"
 "Johnny Boy"
 "Baby Guitar"
 "Deep Down Low"
 "For My Father"
 "Take Me Home"

Personnel
Melanie - guitar, vocals
John Cameron - arranger

Charts

References

1969 albums
Melanie (singer) albums
Albums arranged by John Cameron (musician)
Buddah Records albums